Szob is a district in northern part of Pest County. Szob is also the name of the town where the district seat is found. The district is located in the Central Hungary Statistical Region.

Geography 
Szob District borders with the Slovakian region of Nitra to the north and west, Balassagyarmat District, Rétság District (Nógrád County) and Vác District to the east, Szentendre District to the south, Esztergom District (Komárom-Esztergom County) to the southwest. The number of the inhabited places in Szob District is 17.

Municipalities 
The district has 2 towns and 15 villages.

The bolded municipalities are cities.

Demographics

In 2011, it had a population of 24,875 and the population density was 57/km².

Ethnicity
Besides the Hungarian majority, the main minorities are the German (approx. 900), Roma (500) and Slovak (100).

Total population (2011 census): 24,875
Ethnic groups (2011 census): Identified themselves: 23,598 persons:
Hungarians: 21,716 (92.02%)
Germans: 865 (3.67%)
Gypsies: 515 (2.18%)
Others and indefinable: 502 (2.13%)
Approx. 1,000 persons in Szob District did not declare their ethnic group at the 2011 census.

Religion
Religious adherence in the county according to 2011 census:

Catholic – 13,439 (Roman Catholic – 13,316; Greek Catholic – 118);
Reformed – 2,078;
Evangelical – 405;
other religions – 413; 
Non-religious – 2,456; 
Atheism – 258;
Undeclared – 5,826.

Gallery

See also
List of cities and towns in Hungary

References

External links
 Postal codes of the Szob District

Districts in Pest County